Gilbert Massock (born June 5, 1977 in Cameroon) is a former football player who played mainly for French football clubs. He also played for FC Seoul of the South Korean K League, then known as Anyang LG Cheetahs.

He played for the Cameroonian national team.

References

External links
 
 

1977 births
Living people
Cameroonian footballers
FC Seoul players
K League 1 players
Expatriate footballers in South Korea
SC Abbeville players
USL Dunkerque players
Association football forwards
Cameroon international footballers